Szpaki may refer to:

Szpaki, Masovian Voivodeship, a village in the administrative district of Gmina Dzierzgowo, within Mława County, Masovian Voivodeship, in east-central Poland
Szpaki, Podlaskie Voivodeship, a village in the administrative district of Gmina Wyszki, within Bielsk County, Podlaskie Voivodeship, in north-eastern Poland
Szpaki-Kolonia, a village in the administrative district of Gmina Stara Kornica, within Łosice County, Masovian Voivodeship, in east-central Poland

See also
Szpak